Good as Gold may refer to:

 Good as Gold (novel), a 1979 novel by Joseph Heller
 Good as Gold (Red Rockers album), 1983
 Good as Gold (Eddie Money album), 1996
 "Good as Gold (Stupid as Mud)", a 1994 song by The Beautiful South
 Good as Gold (Doctor Who), a 2012 Doctor Who Script to Screen Blue Peter special episode
 Good as Gold (film), a 1927 American Western film
 “Good as Gold” (song), 2020 song by Ai 
 "Good as Gold", a song by Dala from Best Day, 2012

See also
 Good as Gold!, a 1983 album by Country Gentlemen, released in 1983